The 2018 South American Six Nations, or 6 Naciones Sudamericano, was the 40th edition of the rugby union tournament between South American national teams. This year the tournament was renamed South American Six Nations, replacing the South American Rugby Championship, which was last played in 2017. For the first time, the tournament had six nations participating, including Brazil, Colombia, Paraguay and Chile. Because of superior quality of their national teams, Uruguay and Argentina sent Uruguay A national rugby union team and Argentina XV national rugby union team, the nations' second national rugby team, for this tournament. Unlike the previous year, this tournament abolished a round-robin format and was divided in two groups: The West Conference, composed of Argentina XV, Chile, and Colombia; and the East Conference, made up of Brazil, Uruguay XV, and Paraguay. Each team played the teams in the other conference once.

As the first South American Six Nations championship, this tournament marked a few milestones. Brazil was the South American champion for the first time, after defeating the Argentinian XV team for 36-33 in Buenos Aires. This was the first time ever a Brazilian side defeated an Argentinian side in international rugby union. Conquering the Championship was a milestone for Brazilian rugby, which have been improving ever since the 2000s and received more investments preceding the 2016 Summer Olympics. Also a first, reigning champions Uruguay decided to use a second team to play the Championship, failing to produce results as they finished fourth. Furthermore, this tournament was also the first time that Colombia entered a first level South American tournament. Like Brazil, rugby in Colombia is still a underdeveloped sport which have been going through a process of increasing investments and improving results in the sport.

Standings

Matches

Round 1

Round 2

Round 3

See also
 2019 Rugby World Cup – Americas qualification

References

2018 rugby union tournaments for national teams

rugby union
rugby union

rugby union

International rugby union competitions hosted by Chile

2018
A
rugby union
International rugby union competitions hosted by Uruguay
International rugby union competitions hosted by Paraguay
International rugby union competitions hosted by Brazil